Philosophy & Social Criticism is a peer-reviewed academic journal that publishes papers nine times a year in the field of philosophy. The editor-in-chief is David Rasmussen (Boston College). It was established in 1973 and is currently published by SAGE Publications.

Abstracting and indexing 
Philosophy & Social Criticism is abstracted and indexed in:
 Academic Premier
 Alternative Press Index
 Current Contents/Social and Behavioral Sciences
 Current Legal Sociology
 FRANCIS
 Social Sciences Citation Index

External links 
 

SAGE Publishing academic journals
English-language journals
Social philosophy journals
Publications established in 1973
9 times per year journals